John Paul Hutchinson (born 29 December 1979) is a football manager and former player. He played as a central midfielder for Eastern Pride, Northern Spirit, Manly United, Chengdu Blades and Central Coast Mariners. He also captained the Central Coast Mariners. Born in Australia, he represented the Malta national team internationally.

Hutchinson was born in Morwell, Victoria and made his senior debut for Eastern Pride in the National Soccer League in 1997. Hutchinson went on to play for Northern Spirit and Manly United before joining Central Coast Mariners in 2005. Hutchinson is the all-time most capped Mariners player. He also spent time on loan at Chinese club Chengdu Blades.

Hutchinson won 11 caps with Malta.

Early life
Hutchinson was born in Morwell, and played youth football from age three for Morwell Pegasus, going on to play for the side in the Gippsland Soccer League. He has Maltese ancestry through his mother.

Club career

Gippsland Falcons (Eastern Pride)
Hutchinson is one of the most highly lauded prospects to emerge from the Gippsland Falcons youth setup. John signed with Falcons as a youth by coach Harry Bingham. He made his National Soccer League debut for the club in February 1997, coming on as a substitute in a loss to Marconi-Fairfield. On 2 January 2000 he scored his first league goal, the opener in a 1–1 draw with Adelaide Force.

Despite the limited success of the final seasons of the Falcons (renamed Eastern Pride), Hutchinson received positive reviews for his performances for the club at a young age.

Northern Spirit
In June 2001, Hutchinson moved to Sydney-based National Soccer League side Northern Spirit following the dissolution of Eastern Pride.

Hutchinson was one of several players unpaid during the financial decline of the Spirit, and eventually was left clubless when the club folded in 2004.

Manly United
Hutchinson next played for Manly United in the NSW Premier League, where he was club captain.

Central Coast Mariners
Hutchinson made his competitive debut for the Mariners in qualifying competition for the 2005 OFC Club Championship, coming on at half-time against Newcastle Jets in a match the Mariners eventually won in a penalty shootout. Hutchinson came on in the final minutes of the 2005 A-League Pre-Season Challenge Cup final against Perth Glory as the Mariners won their first ever piece of silverware in August 2005. He was also a last-minute substitute in his A-League debut, again a 1–0 win over Perth in what was the second ever A-League match. His first Mariners goal came in a 5–1 loss to Sydney FC on 5 November 2005. Around this time, Hutchinson began to be used as a forward, a role which saw him score six goals from six games, including a brace against Newcastle Jets in the F3 derby. Hutchinson's season ended prematurely after picking up an injury in a match against Sydney FC.

Hutchinson came on in extra time in the 2006 A-League Pre-Season Challenge Cup final against Adelaide United and converted his penalty in the 5–4 loss in a penalty shoot-out. Hutchinson's only goal of the 2006–07 season was the Mariners' first in the 2006–07 A-League, the opening goal in a 1-all draw with Newcastle Jets.
 
After recovering from a knee injury, Hutchinson became a key player for the Central Coast Mariners, playing in central midfield with the likes of Mile Jedinak and Tom Pondeljak in Version 3 of the A-League. This form led him to be named one of the most influential players in the A-League. On 28 October 2007, Hutchinson scored a double against Sydney FC, with two strikes off either foot from outside the box, but was unable to prevent the Mariners suffering a 3–2 loss. The Mariners won the 2007–08 A-League Premiership, and came within one game of the Championship, losing to the Jets in the 2008 A-League Grand Final, with Hutchinson playing a full match.

Hutchinson played his 100th A-League match in August 2009 - a 1–1 draw against Newcastle Jets - becoming just the second Mariner to achieve this milestone after Alex Wilkinson.

In 2011, Hutchinson was loaned to Chinese Super League side Chengdu Blades, under former Mariners coach Lawrie McKinna and alongside fellow Mariner Adam Kwasnik. Hutchinson scored his first goal for the side in a 2-all draw with Changchun Yatai on 31 July 2011, having made his debut three weeks prior in a loss to Shandong Luneng.

Hutchinson came on as a substitute for Mustafa Amini in the 2011 A-League Grand Final and scored a penalty in the shoot-out but it was not enough as the Mariners lost 4–2.

Hutchinson was part of the Mariners side which won the 2011–12 A-League Premiership.

Hutchinson has most recently played an important role in the strong A-League performance of the Central Coast Mariners over recent years and was named club captain after long-serving captain Alex Wilkinson  departed the club before the 2012–2013 season. He captained the side to its first ever A-League Championship, beating Western Sydney in the 2013 A-League Grand Final.

Hutchinson played his 200th A-League match on 5 April 2014 - a loss away to Perth.

The 2014–15 season is Hutchinson's tenth with the Mariners. In November 2014, Hutchinson scored a goal in the 94th minute from outside the box to secure a 2-all draw for the Mariners with Melbourne City, breaking a run of four consecutive losses. Hutchinson concluded his 10-year professional career with a 3–1 loss to Melbourne Victory in the final round of the 2014/15 A-League season, capping of his 226th league appearance for the Central Coast. A testimonial match was held to conclude John's career on 23 May, attracting a crowd of over two thousand as to watch "Hutch's XI" versus the Mariners. The match yielded  17 goals, with "Hutch's XI" netting a dozen of those to win the match 12–5.

He is currently the most capped Central Coast Mariners player, with over 200 appearances for the Gosford side.

International career

Australia
Following a strong 2007–08 A-League season, Hutchinson was called up to a Socceroos training squad for A-League players by Pim Verbeek in early 2008. He appeared for the side in a training match against the Olyroos, coming on as a substitute in a 2–1 loss.

Malta
Due to his Maltese descent, he earned a call-up by coach Dušan Fitzel, and he made his international debut for the Maltese national team in an exhibition match against the Czech Republic, where he was employed in centre midfield for the whole game. On 10 June 2009, John Hutchinson played his first full competitive match for Malta in the 2010 World Cup qualifier loss to Sweden at the Ullevi Stadium in Gothenburg, facing the likes of Zlatan Ibrahimović. Hutchinson's best result with the side came in a 1–1 draw at home against Georgia. Hutchinson's opportunities to play at international level were at times limited by club commitments and the considerable travel involved in flying between Australia and Europe for games. Hutchinson made eleven appearances for Malta.

Coaching career
From 2015 to 2016, Hutchinson served as assistant coach at the Mariners, before parting ways in August 2016. On 1 March 2017, Hutchinson was appointed assistant coach for Seattle Sounders FC 2. On 30 January 2018 Hutchinson was appointed as head coach for S2. On 23 January 2019 S2 announced that he would be departing the club to return to coach in Australia. On the same day, he was announced as the assistant manager of Western United.

Hutchinson was appointed head coach and technical director of El Paso Locomotive FC on 9 December 2021. On 15 November 2022, Hutchinson left El Paso to return home to Australia.

Career statistics

Club

International

Managerial statistics

Honours
Manly United
NSW Super League: 2004

Central Coast Mariners
A-League Championship: 2012–13
A-League Premiership: 2006–07, 2011–12
A-League Pre-Season Challenge Cup: 2005

Records
 Most appearances for Central Coast Mariners: 271 games

References

External links
 
 
 
 John Hutchinson profile at SoundersFC.com
 John Hutchinson profile at OzFootball.net

1979 births
Living people
People from the City of Latrobe
Australian people of Maltese descent
People with acquired Maltese citizenship
Association football midfielders
Australian soccer players
A-League Men players
Chinese Super League players
National Soccer League (Australia) players
Central Coast Mariners FC players
Chengdu Tiancheng F.C. players
Gippsland Falcons players
Manly United FC players
Northern Spirit FC players
Central Coast Mariners FC non-playing staff
Seattle Sounders FC non-playing staff
Maltese footballers
Malta international footballers
Expatriate footballers in China
Australian expatriate soccer players
Maltese expatriate footballers
Sportsmen from Victoria (Australia)
People from Morwell, Victoria
Tacoma Defiance coaches
Australian soccer coaches
El Paso Locomotive FC coaches
Maltese football managers
Australian expatriate soccer coaches
Australian expatriate sportspeople in China
Maltese expatriates in China
Australian expatriate sportspeople in the United States
Maltese expatriate sportspeople in the United States
Soccer players from Victoria (Australia)